Tviberi is a glacier located in the Svaneti Region of Georgia on the southern slopes of the Greater Caucasus Mountain Range. Tviberi represents a polisynthetic type of a valley glacier. It has many tributaries among which are Laskhedari, Iriti, Asmashi, Toti, Seri and others. The surface of Tviberi is mainly covered with morainal sediments and debris. The glacier feeds off of the runoff and ice flows from the adjacent peaks.
The nearest larger community is Mestia, 13.5 km southwest of Tviberi Glacier. The area around Tviberi Glacier consists mainly of grassland.

See also 
Glaciers of Georgia

References 

Glaciers of Georgia (country)
Svaneti